The Second Battle of Talal took place in the year 1873 between the army of Imam Saud bin Faisal bin Turki Al Saud and members of the Otaiba tribe.

The reasons for the battle 
After the Battle of Al-Bura in the year 1871, a delegation of tribal chiefs congratulated Imam Saud bin Faisal Al Saud on his victory over his brother Imam Abdullah. And when the affairs of Imam Saud's army improved, he went to fight Muslit bin Rubayan because of the raids he made on Riyadh in favor of Imam Abdullah.

Participating tribes 
Some tribes joined the side of Imam Saud to fight Muslit bin Rubayan, and among those tribes: the Ajman tribe, the Mutair tribe, the Subay' tribe, the Suhool tribe, and the Dawasir tribe.

Battle 
The news reached Sheikh Muslit before the arrival of the army of Imam Saud, and Muslit bin Rubayan and those with him were present in Harrat Kashab at Jabal Talal.

Muslit bin Rubayan removed the women and money from the battle site and prepared those with him to fight, their number was 800 men, and the army of Imam Saud numbered 3,000 fighters. The two teams fought from morning until noon, then Imam Saud was defeated, Muslit's army seized his camp and his horses, and Imam Saud and those who stayed with him fled to Riyadh when he was wounded. This battle was decisive in the history of Imam Saud, for which there was no list after that.

Losses 
The battle caused the death of Saud bin Sunitan Al Saud, Muhammad Ahmad Al-Sudairy, the governor of the city of Ghat, and Ali bin Ibrahim bin Suwaid, the governor of the city of Jalajel. It also caused the death of Fahd bin Sadhan, Saleh bin Ibrahim bin Musa bin Fawzan bin Issa, Suleiman bin Abdullah bin Khalaf bin Issa, Saad bin Muhammad bin Abdul Karim. Al Bawardi, who are residents of the city of Shaqraa He died from the army of Imam Saud because of being lost in the desert, and they died of thirst

References 

History of Saudi Arabia